William Wiman Andrus, also spelled Wyman, (October 14, 1858 – June 17, 1935), was a Canadian professional baseball player who played one game for the  Providence Grays, in his only appearance in Major League Baseball. The game took place on September 15, with Andrus playing third base. He collect no hits in four at bats with one strikeout. He is interred at Custer County Cemetery, which is also in Miles City.

References

External links

1858 births
1935 deaths
19th-century baseball players
19th-century Canadian people (post-Confederation)
Baseball people from Ontario
Canadian expatriate baseball players in the United States
Major League Baseball players from Canada
Major League Baseball third basemen
Sportspeople from Clarington
Providence Grays players
Minneapolis Millers (baseball) players
Hamilton Clippers players
Portland (minor league baseball) players
Hamilton Hams players
Buffalo Bisons (minor league) players
Montreal (minor league baseball) players
Grand Rapids Shamrocks players
Jamestown (minor league baseball) players
Manchester Amskoegs players
Kansas City Cowboys (minor league) players